A picket (archaically, picquet [variant form piquet]) is a soldier, or small unit of soldiers, placed on a defensive line forward of a friendly position to provide timely warning and screening against an enemy advance. It can also refer to any unit (e.g. a scout vehicle, surveillance aircraft or patrol ship) performing a similar function. A picket guarding a fixed position may be known as a sentry or guard.

Origins
Picket (Fr. It was in use in the British Army before 1735 and probably much earlier.

Usage
Picket now refers to a unit (either naval or army) maintaining a watch. This may mean a watch for the enemy, or other types of watch e.g. fire picket. This can be likened to the art of sentry keeping.

A staggered picket consists of, for example, two soldiers where one soldier is relieved at a time. This is so that on any given picket one soldier is fresh, having just started the picket, while the other is ready to be relieved. Although each soldier is required to maintain watch for the full duration of a shift, halfway through each shift a new soldier is put on watch.

See also

Radar picket
Screening (tactic)
Screw picket
Skirmisher
Point man
Vedette (sentry), a mounted sentry or outpost

Notes

References

Force protection tactics